The following is a list of Eastern Orthodox Christian monasteries and sketes, both male and female, in the United States of America.

Antiochian Orthodox Christian Archdiocese of North America
 St. Paul Skete, Grand Junction, Tennessee.  Female skete.  Superior: Mother Nektaria.

 The Monastery of Our Lady and St. Laurence, Canon City, Colorado. Abbot: Father Theodore.

Ecumenical Patriarchate institutions in America

Stavropegial Monasteries
 Sacred Patriarchal and Stavropegial Monastery of St. Irene Chrysovalantou, Astoria, New York. . Abbot: Bishop Ierotheos Zakharis.
 Holy Theotokos Monastery, North Fort Myers, Florida.
 Holy Patriarchal And Stavropegic Monastery Of The Entrance Of The Theotokos, Malbis, Alabama.

Greek Orthodox Archdiocese of America
This archdiocese has had a small number of formerly Athonite monks who were given a blessing to start monasteries.  In recognition of this, any such spiritual father of a monastery will be listed.

Male
 St. Gregory Palamas Monastery, Hayesville, Ohio. Abbot, Archimandrite Joseph. 
 St. Anthony's Greek Orthodox Monastery, Florence, Arizona.  Abbot: Archimandrite Paisios.  Spiritual Father: Elder Ephrem. 
 Holy Archangels Greek Orthodox Monastery, Kendalia, Texas.  Archimandrite Dositheos.  Spiritual Father: Elder Ephrem. 
 Panagia Vlahernon Greek Orthodox Monastery, Williston, Florida.  Archimandrite Polycarp.  Spiritual Father: Elder Ephrem 
 Holy Trinity Monastery Greek Orthodox Monastery, Smith Creek, Michigan.  Hieromonk Joseph.  Spiritual Father: Elder Ephrem
 Panagia Pammakaristou Greek Orthodox Monastery, Lawsonville, North Carolina.  Hieromonk Nektarios.  Spiritual Father: Elder Ephrem
 St. Nektarios Greek Orthodox Monastery, Roscoe, New York.  Archimandrite Joseph.  Spiritual Father: Elder Ephrem
 Holy Transfiguration Greek Orthodox Monastery, Harvard, Illinois. Father Akakios. Spiritual Father: Ephraim (Moraitis)

Female
 Entrance of the Mother of God into the Temple Skete, Hayesville, Ohio. Abbess Theadelphi. Spiritual Father: Archimandrite Joseph. 
 Nativity of the Theotokos Greek Orthodox Monastery, Saxonburg, Pennsylvania. Abbess Theophano. Spiritual Father: Elder Ephrem 
 Holy Protection Greek Orthodox Monastery, White Haven, Pennsylvania. Abbess Olympiada. Spiritual Father: Elder Ephrem 
 St. John Chrysostom Greek Orthodox Monastery, Pleasant Prairie, Wisconsin. Abbess Melanie. Spiritual Father: Elder Ephrem 
 The Living Spring Greek Orthodox Monastery, Dunlap, California. Abbess Markella. Spiritual Father: Elder Ephrem
 St. John the Forerunner Greek Orthodox Monastery, Goldendale, Washington. Abbess Efpraxia. Spiritual Father: Elder Ephrem 
 Holy Annunciation Greek Orthodox Monastery, Reddick, Florida. Abbess Agapia. Spiritual Father: Elder Ephrem 
 Panagia Prousiotissa Greek Orthodox Monastery, Troy, North Carolina. Abbess Agne. Spiritual Father: Elder Ephrem 
 St. Paraskevi Greek Orthodox Monastery, Washington, Texas. Abbess Paraskevi. Spiritual Father: Elder Ephrem 
 All Saints Greek Orthodox Monastery, Calverton, Long Island, New York. Abbess Eisodia. 
 Paracletos Greek Orthodox Monastery, Abbeville, South Carolina. Abbess Pavlina.

Ukrainian Orthodox Church in the United States
St. Elijah Monastery, Dover, Florida. Male Monastery. Abbot Anastasie.

Vicariate for the Orthodox Christian Communities of Slavic Tradition
 St. Nicholas Monastery

Greek Orthodox Old Calendarists
See Greek Old Calendarists, as they are separated from Eucharistic communion with the local Orthodox Churches.

Male
Holy Orthodox Church in North America
Holy Transfiguration Greek Orthodox Monastery, Brookline, Massachusetts.  Abbot Isaac. 
Holy Ascension Skete, York, Maine

Autonomous Orthodox Metropolia of North and South America and the British Isles
Abbey of the Holy Name, West Milford, New Jersey (Western Rite). 

Church of the Genuine Orthodox Christians of Greece
 Monastery of the Holy Ascension, Woodstock, New York.  Metropolitan Demetrios. 
 St. Gregory Palamas Monastery, Etna, California.  Abbot Archimandrite Akakios
 St. John of San Francisco Orthodox Monastery, Cobleskill, New York. Abbot Metropolitan Demetrios 
 Monastery of the Dormition of the Holy Theotokos, Preston Hollow, New York. Igoumen Hieromonk Damian. Dependency of St. John of San Francisco Orthodox Monastery
 St. John the New Almsgiver Hermitage Argyle, Nova Scotia Dependency of St. John of San Francisco Orthodox Monastery
 Monastery of Saint John the Theologian, Montreal, Quebec, Canada Dependency of St. John of San Francisco Orthodox Monastery 
 Hermitage of St. Ignatius the God-bearer, Santa Cruz Naranja, Guatemala Dependency of St. John of San Francisco Orthodox Monastery
 Monastery of Saint Gregory of Sinai, Kelseyville, California. Abbot Bishop Sergios of Portland

Female
Holy Orthodox Church in North America
Holy Nativity Convent, Brookline, Massachusetts. Abbess Mother Seraphima

Convent of Saint Mary Magdalene, Warrenton, Virginia. Abbess Mother Eirene

Church of the Genuine Orthodox Christians of Greece
Saint Syncletike Monastery, Farmingdale, New York.  Metropolitan Demetrios. 
Convent of St. Anna, Montreal, Quebec, Canada
Convent of the Protection of the Holy Virgin Mary, Bluffton, Alberta, Canada 
Convent of St. Elizabeth the Grand Duchess of Russia, Etna, California. Abbess Mother Elizabeth

Moscow Patriarchate

Patriarchal parishes in the United States
The Monastery of St. Mary of Egypt (Mercy House), New York City, New York.  Igumen Joachim.
Holy Trinity Monastery, Baltimore, Maryland.  Dependency of The Monastery of St. Mary of Egypt.

Russian Orthodox Church outside Russia

Male
 Holy Trinity Monastery, Jordanville, New York.
 Hermitage of the Holy Cross, Wayne, West Virginia.  Male monastery.  Abbot: Archimandrite Seraphim.  
Skete of St. John the Theologian, Hiram, Ohio.  Superior: Hieromonk Nektarios.
 All-Merciful Saviour Monastery, Vashon Island, Washington.  Superior: Abbot Tryphon. 
 Christ the Saviour Monastery, Hamilton, Ontario. Male Monastery, Western Rite. Superior: Abbot James (Deschene) 
 New Kursk-Root Icon Hermitage, Mahopac, New York.
 Monastery of the Holy Cross, East Setauket, New York. Male monastery. Archimandrite Maximos, Abbot.
 Our Lady of Mount Royal "Holyrood", Jacksonville, Florida. Male monastery.  Western Rite. Superior: Abbot David Pierce. (currently closed)
 Ascension Orthodox Monastery, Riverview, Florida. Male monastery.  Stavropegial. Archimandrite: Abbot Martin Hohlfeld. Father Martin reposed (in 2015?)
 Saint Anthony the Great Orthodox Monastery, Phoenix, Arizona.  Stavropeghial Monastery under the President of the Synod of Bishops; founded in 1983; Abbot: Bessarion
 St. Sabbas Russian Orthodox Monastery, Harper Woods, Michigan. Male monastery. Archimandrite Pachomy. 
Monastery of St. Demetrios (Spotsylvania, Virginia). Superior Metropolitan Jonah.
 Brotherhood of St. John Climacus, (Atlantic Mine, Michigan). Male monastery. Abbot: Bishop Peter of Cleveland, Superior: Hieromonk Alexander 
 Hermitage of St. John the Divine, Syracuse, New York. Male Monastics/Hermits. Western Rite/Old Calendar. Superior: Acting-Prior Fr Stavrophoremonk Symeon Najmanje. Founded 1998 under another jurisdiction. Received into ROCOR on 14 Dec. 2014 as a Stavropegial monastic house [23]
 St. Silouan the Athonite Monastery, Sonora, California. Male monastery. Consecrated in 2015. Superior: Deputy Abbot Monk Ignatius.

Female
 Monastery of the Dormition, Stavropegial Convent of the Dormition Novo Diveevo, Nanuet, New York.  Superior: Abbess Makaria.
 Convent of St Elizabeth, Mohawk, New York.  Superior: Mother Elisabeth.
 Convent of the Nativity, Wayne, West Virginia.
 Monastery of the Glorious Ascension, Resaca, Georgia.
New Tikhvin Skete of the Holy Mother of God, Palm Coast, Florida. Superior: Mother Elizabeth (Klipa - Bacha)
St. Paisius Monastery, Safford, Arizona. Superior:  Abbess Michaila.

Orthodox Church in America
Companions of New Skete (Emmaus House), Cambridge, New York.  Superior: Sr Melanie Updike.
Ss. Sergius and Herman of Valaam Chapel, Spruce Island, Alaska.
Protecting Veil of the Theotokos Orthodox Community, Anchorage, Alaska.

Male
St. Tikhon's Orthodox Monastery, South Canaan, Pennsylvania.  Abbot Archimandrite Sergius (Bowyer). 
Monks of New Skete, Cambridge, New York.  Father Christopher, prior.
The Ascension of Our Lord Monastery, Detroit, Michigan.  Superior: Archimandrite Mihail.
Monastery of the Holy Archangel Michael, Canones, New Mexico.  Monk Silouan.
St. John of Shanghai Monastery, Manton, California.  Superior Hieromonk Innocent (Green).
Holy Cross Monastery, Castro Valley, California.  Archimandrite Theodor (Micka). 
Hermitage of the Annunciation, Watford, Nova Scotia.  Hieromonk Roman (Bonnel).
Hermitage of St. Anthony the Great, Westport, Ontario.  Monk Pierre (Vachon).
Holy Transfiguration Hermitage, Gibsons, British Columbia.
Monastic Society of St. Silouan the Athonite, Johnstown, Ontario.  Superior: Monk Seraphim.
The Hesychastic Society of the Most Holy Mary, Toronto, Ontario — (Metochion of the Monastic Society of St. Silouan the Athonite). Designed for Aboriginal and Autistic Orthodox.

Female
Holy Assumption Monastery, Calistoga, California.  Mother Melania
Ss. Mary and Martha Monastery, Wagener, South Carolina.  Mother Thekla.
Holy Myrrhbearers Monastery, Otego, New York.  Mother Raphaela.
Our Lady of the Sign Monastery (Nuns of New Skete), Cambridge, New York.  Mother Cecelia.
Orthodox Monastery of the Transfiguration, Ellwood City, Pennsylvania.  Mother Christophora.
Dormition of the Mother of God Monastery, Rives Junction, Michigan. Mother Gabriella.
Protection of the Holy Virgin Monastery, Lake George, Colorado.  Mother Cassiana.
St Barbara Monastery, Santa Paula, California.  Mother Victoria.
Our Lady of Kazan Skete, Santa Rosa, California.  Mother Suzanna.
Nativity of Our Lord & Savior Jesus Christ Monastery, Kemp, Texas.  Mother Barbara.
Holy Resurrection Monastery, Niangua, Missouri. Mother Alexandra

Romanian Orthodox Archdiocese in the Americas

Male
Holy Cross Orthodox Monastery, Toronto (York), Ontario, Canada. Archimandrite Nicolas (Giroux). 
Monastère de la Protection-de-la-Mère-de-Dieu, Wentworth, Québec, Canada. Higoumène Cyrille (Bradette).
St. Dumitru Retreat and Monastic Centre, Middletown, New York, United States. Hieromonk Theoctist.

Female
Protection of the Mother of God Monastery, Ellenville, New York, United States. Mother Ambrozia.
 Holy Annunciation Hermitage, 10087 W. Rolling Meadows Dr., Westville, IN 46391. Mother Theodora. 
 Holy Dormition of the Mother of God, 3389 Rives Eaton Rd, Rives Junction, MI 49277. Marian Cristian Rosu http://www.dormitionmonastery.org/

Serbian Orthodox Church in the USA and Canada
Most Holy Mother of God Monastery, Springboro, Pennsylvania.
Sretenje Monastery, (Escondido, California) or Monastery of the Meeting of the Lord. Administrator: V. Rev Protopresbyter Milovan Kantić.
Holy Archangel Michael and All Angels Skete is the collective term for three monastic communities in Weatherby, Missouri: Holy Archangel Michael and All Angels Skete; St. Xenia Sisterhood (1997); and Protection of the Virgin Mary. Superiors: Hieromonk Alexii; Abbess Brigid; and Abbess Sergia respectively. Under the spiritual jurisdiction of Bishop Longin.
The Holy Transfiguration Serbian Orthodox Monastery, Campbellville, Ontario, Canada. Under the jurisdiction of Bishop Mitrophan.
Serbian Catacomb Church, Monastery of All Serbian Saints, Columbus, Michigan. Under the spiritual jurisdiction of Bishop Artemije of the Eparchy of Raska-Prizren in exile.
Saint Nikolaj Velimirović Bishop of Žiča Serbian Orthodox Monastery, China, Michigan. Caretaker: Radiša Ninković.
Mother of God, Joy of All Who Sorrow Monastery, Monteagle, Tennessee. Under the spiritual jurisdiction of Bishop Longin.

Male
Saint Herman of Alaska Monastery, Platina, California. Administrators: V. Rev. Hieromonk Abbot Damascene and Rev. Hieromonk Paisius.
St. Archangel Michael Skete (Ouzinkie, Alaska)|St. Archangel Michael Serbian Orthodox Skete, Ouzinkie, Alaska. Administrator: Rev. Hieromonk Andrew. Associated with St. Herman of Alaska Monastery.
St. Sava's Serbian Orthodox Monastery, located at the Episcopal headquarters of Bishop Irinej of the Serbian Orthodox Eparchy of Eastern America in Libertyville, Illinois.
New Gračanica Monastery, Episcopal headquarters of Bishop Longin of the Serbian Orthodox Eparchy of New Gračanica and Midwestern America, Third Lake, Illinois.
Saint Steven's Orthodox Cathedral, Episcopal headquarters of Bishop Maksim of the Serbian Orthodox Eparchy of Western America, Alhambra, California.
St. Mark Serbian Orthodox Monastery, Sheffield, Ohio.
Episcopal residence of Bishop Irinej of the Serbian Orthodox Diocese of Eastern America at 65 Overlook Circle in New Rochelle, New York, 10804

Female
Nativity of the Mother of God Serbian Orthodox Patriarchal Monastery, New Carlisle, Indiana.  Double monastery: Igumanija Evpraksija and Igumen Gavrilo.
St. Xenia Serbian Orthodox Skete, Lake Wildwood, California. Administrator Rev. Mother Abbess Dorothea. Sister monastery of St. Herman of Alaska Monastery.
St. Nilus Island Skete, Ouzinkie, Alaska. Administrator: Rev. Mother Abbess Nina. Associated with St. Herman of Alaska Monastery.
Monastery Marcha, Richfield, Ohio.  Mother Anna.
Monastery of St. Paisius, Safford, Arizona.  Mother Michaila. Now under two jurisdictions, bishops Kyrill of San Francisco and Western America (ROCOR) and Maksim of the Serbian Orthodox Eparchy of Western America.
St. Xenia Metochion Monastery, Indianapolis, Indiana. Nun Katherine, Superior.
St. Pachomious Monastery, Greenfield, Missouri
Protection of the Virgin Mary Monastery, Weatherby, Missouri
St. Xenia Sisterhood, Weatherby, Missouri

Georgian Orthodox Church

Male
 Sacred Monastery of St. Iakovos New Studion, Piedmont, Oklahoma

Female
 Sacred Monastery of St. Nina, Union Bridge, Maryland

References

External sources

 Greek Orthodox Archdiocese Monastic Communities

 
Eastern Orthodox Monasteries
Monasteries, United States